James Cobbett (12 January 1804 – 31 March 1842) was an English professional cricketer who played first-class cricket from 1826 to 1841 for Middlesex, Surrey and Sheffield Cricket Club (aka Yorkshire). Considered by many - according to The Cricketer and Wisden - to be "the finest allrounder of his day", Cobbett was a right-handed batsman, occasional wicket-keeper and right arm slow roundarm bowler.

Cobbett began as an MCC ground staff bowler who occasionally stood as umpire. He started a playing career with Middlesex in 1826, as Surrey - the county of his birth - featured little in first-class cricket at the time. He played only once for them in 1839, as well as matches for Yorkshire in 1835. He represented the Players in the Gentlemen v Players series and the South in the North v. South series. But it was for the MCC between 1830 and 1841, that he made most of his appearances: 47 in all, scoring 78 runs and taking 311 wickets.

References

External links
 

1804 births
1842 deaths
English cricketers
English cricketers of 1826 to 1863
Middlesex cricketers
Marylebone Cricket Club cricketers
Surrey cricketers
Married v Single cricketers
Players cricketers
Left-Handed v Right-Handed cricketers
Gentlemen cricketers
North v South cricketers
Gentlemen of England cricketers
Fast v Slow cricketers
Yorkshire cricketers
A to K v L to Z cricketers
Lord Strathavon's XI cricketers